Kojetice is a municipality and village in Třebíč District in the Vysočina Region of the Czech Republic. It has about 500 inhabitants.

Geography
It lies in the Jevišovice Uplands.

History
The first written mention of Kojetice is from 1349.

Demographics

Economy
In the municipality lies the northernmost vineyards in the Znojmo wine subregion.

Notable people
Eliška Misáková (1926–1948), gymnast

References

External links

Villages in Třebíč District